Nguyenvansang's snake (Colubroelaps nguyenvansangi ) is a species of snake in the family Colubridae. The species is endemic to Vietnam.

Etymology
The specific name, nguyenvansangi, is in honor of Vietnamese herpetologist Nguyen Van Sang.

Taxonomy
As of 2019, the genus Colubroelaps is monotypic, containing the sole species C. nguyenvansangi.

Geographic range
C. nguyenvansangi is found in southern Vietnam, in Bình Phước Province and Lâm Đồng Province.

Description
The head is small, roundish, and short, and is not distinct from the body. The body is very slender. The dorsal scales are in 15 rows at midbody. Dorsally, it is striped with brown and black. Ventrally, in striking contrast, it is uniform white.

References

Further reading
Orlov, Nikolai L.; Kharin, Vladimir E.; Ananjeva, Natalia B.; Nguyen, Thien Tao; Nguyen, Truong Quang (2009). "A New Genus and Species of Colubrid Snake (Squamata, Ophidia, Colubridae) from South Vietnam (Lam Dong Province)". Russian Journal of Herpetology 16 (3): 228–240. (Colubroelaps, new genus; C. nguyenvansangi, new species). (in English).

Colubrids
Monotypic snake genera
Reptiles described in 2009
Reptiles of Southeast Asia
Reptiles of Vietnam

Snakes of Vietnam
Snakes of Southeast Asia
Snakes of Asia